This is a list of public holidays in Ivory Coast.

Public holidays

Variable dates

2020
Easter Monday – April 13
Qadr Night (Revelation of the Quran) – May 20
Ascension Day – May 21
Korité (Breaking of the Ramadan fast) – May 24
Whit Monday – June 1
Tabaski (Feast of the Sacrifice) – starts July 31
Mawlid (Prophet's birthday) – starts at sundown, October 28
2021
Easter Monday – April 5
Qadr Night (Revelation of the Quran) – May 9
Ascension Day – May 13
Korité (Breaking of the Ramadan fast) – May 13
Whit Monday – May 29
Tabaski (Feast of the Sacrifice) – starts July 20
Mawlid (Prophet's birthday) – starts at sundown, October 18
2022
Easter Monday – April 18
Qadr Night (Revelation of the Quran) – April 29
Korité (Breaking of the Ramadan fast)– May 2
Whit Monday – June 6
Tabaski (Feast of the Sacrifice) – starts July 9
Mawlid (Prophet's birthday) – starts at sundown, October 7
2023
Easter Monday – April 10
Qadr Night (Revelation of the Quran) – April 17
Korité (Breaking of the Ramadan fast)– April 21
Whit Monday – May 29
Tabaski (Feast of the Sacrifice) – starts June 28
Mawlid  (Prophet's birthday) – starts at sundown, September 26
2024
Easter Monday – April 1
Qadr Night (Revelation of the Quran) – April 6
Korité (Breaking of the Ramadan fast)– April 10
Whit Monday – May 20
Tabaski (Feast of the Sacrifice) – starts June 16
2025
Easter Monday – April 21
2026
Easter Monday – April 6
2027
Easter Monday – April 29
2028
Easter Monday – April 17
2029
Easter Monday – April 1

References 

Ivorian culture
Ivory
Ivory Coast